Danielle Sierra Kamela (born March 18, 1988) is an American professional wrestler and actress. She previously worked for WWE under the name Vanessa Borne.

Early life
Kamela was born to parents of Samoan, Polish, Chinese, German, and Irish descent. A graduate of Chaparral High School and Arizona State University, Kamela worked as a Fox Sports Arizona presenter, Phoenix Suns dancer, and Arizona Cardinals cheerleader prior to her wrestling career.

Professional wrestling career

Knokx Pro Entertainment (2016)
Kamela trained with Rikishi and Gangrel at Knokx Pro Entertainment. She made her in-ring debut on March 26, 2016, using her real name Danielle. She was defeated by Pedro in the European Cruiserweight Championship Match.

WWE (2016–2021)
On April 12, 2016, it was announced that Kamela had signed with WWE, where she was assigned to the WWE Performance Center in Orlando, Florida. She made her WWE NXT debut shortly after at a live event, under her real name. Her television debut took place on the October 5, 2016, episode of NXT, working as an enhancement talent, where she was defeated by Peyton Royce. She made another appearance on the October 19 episode of NXT, where she was defeated by Nikki Cross, but the decision was later reversed because Cross continued to attack Kamela. On June 28, 2017, Kamela returned to television under the new ring name Vanessa Borne, where she defeated Jayme Hachey in a Mae Young Classic qualifier match. On July 13, she was eliminated from the tournament in the first round by Serena Deeb. Towards the rest of the year and the beginning of 2018, Borne continued to compete against various competitors such as Liv Morgan, Nikki Cross, Kairi Sane, and Dakota Kai, however, she ended up on the losing side against all of them.

On February 13, 2019, Borne started an alliance with Aliyah, after she helped her defeat Taynara Conti. In their first match together, Borne and Aliyah defeated Conti and Xia Li. On the November 27 episode of NXT, she faced Li in a losing effort after Li kayfabe injured Aliyah with a spin kick to her nose. Borne was reportedly called up to the main roster in January 2020 upon re-signing her contract, but after months of inactivity, she was released on May 19, 2021.

All Elite Wrestling (2022)
On the February 5, 2022 tapings of AEW Dark, Kamela made her debut in a losing effort against Marina Shafir. On the April 19, 2022 episode of AEW Dark, Kamela won her first AEW match by defeating Rache Chanel. On April 20, Kamela appeared on AEW Dynamite, competing against Dr. Britt Baker, losing in a qualifying match for the Owen Hart Foundation Tournament.

Championships and accomplishments 
KnokX Pro Entertainment
 European Cruiserweight Championship (1 time)

Filmography

Film

Television

References

External links

 
 
 
 

Living people
American professional wrestlers of Samoan descent
American female professional wrestlers
Actresses of Samoan descent
Sportspeople from Scottsdale, Arizona
Professional wrestlers from Arizona
National Basketball Association cheerleaders
National Football League cheerleaders
1988 births
American sportswomen of Chinese descent
American people of Polish descent
American people of German descent
American people of Irish descent
21st-century American women
21st-century professional wrestlers